Karla DeVito (born May 29, 1953) is an American singer and actress.

Early life and education
DeVito was born in suburban Chicago in Mokena, Illinois. She attended Willow Crest Grade School in Mokena and Lincoln-Way High School in New Lenox. She attended Loyola University Chicago and majored in theater. During her freshman year, she joined the Chicago cast of Godspell. In 1971–72, Karla studied with Jo Forsberg at the Second City Company in Chicago and was part of the Second City Children's Theatre group with Bill Murray. In 1973, she was in the cast of the musical Hair.

Career
DeVito started her career in 1972, joining the national company of Godspell. A few years later, she became the lead singer of the band Orchestra Luna, and through that joined the cast of Jim Steinman's show Neverland, which had a run as a workshop production at the Kennedy Center in 1977.

Two months later, DeVito went on tour with Meat Loaf and Jim Steinman with their album Bat Out of Hell. She is seen singing with Meat Loaf in the video clip of "Paradise by the Dashboard Light" and "Bat Out of Hell", synced to the original vocal by Ellen Foley. After completing this tour, she returned to theatre in an off-broadway version of Cole Porter's Jubilee and LaMama's production of A Midsummer Night's Dream. She then moved on to playing the lead role in The Pirates of Penzance on Broadway  where she met future husband, Robby Benson.

She performed on Jim Steinman's only solo album, Bad for Good, on the track "Dance in My Pants" and its subsequent music video.

In 1981, DeVito released her debut solo album, Is This a Cool World or What? and the track Bloody Bess was intended to be a rock musical about a female pirate in the 17th century.

DeVito also contributed background vocals for some groups such as Blue Öyster Cult and the band Sorrows. As a solo performer, she opened shows for Hall & Oates and Rick Springfield in the 1980s.

DeVito's second album, Wake 'Em Up in Tokyo was released by A&M in 1986.  Her song, "We Are Not Alone", was featured in the motion picture The Breakfast Club (1985). In 1989, DeVito performed in South Carolina and returned in 1990 as part of "An Evening of Andrew Lloyd Webber". In 1990, DeVito co-starred in the film Modern Love and sang on two of the songs for the soundtrack. In 2002, DeVito sang the part of Elizabeth for the CD recording of Graham Russell's rock opera The Heart of the Rose which had a limited release on CD. In 2016, she contributed vocals to Meat Loaf's Braver Than We Are.

Personal life
DeVito married actor, director, singer, and teacher Robby Benson on July 11, 1982. The couple have two children, a son and a daughter.

Discography

Studio albums
 Is This a Cool World or What? (1981)
 Wake 'Em Up In Tokyo (1986)

Guest appearances
 "Dance In My Pants" with Jim Steinman (from Bad for Good) (1981)
 "I'm Just Happy to Be Here" with Ellen Foley (from Fighting Words) (2021)

Soundtrack appearances
 "We Are Not Alone" (from The Breakfast Club) (1985)

Filmography
Two of a Kind (1982) - Barbra
Modern Love (1990) - Billie
The Legend of Prince Valiant (1992–1993) - Lady Megan, Elizabeth, Princess Sadisa (voice)
Family Album (1993) - Mrs. DeVito
Bonkers (1993) - Officer Miranda Wright (voice)
Phantom 2040 (1995) - Athena (voice)
O. Henry's Christmas (1996) - Della
Road Rovers (1996) - Woman Soldier (voice)
Sabrina, the Teenage Witch (1996) - Mary
Fired Up (1997) - Woman
The New Batman Adventures (1998) - Cassidy (voice)
Straight Outta Tompkins (2015) - Jane

References

External links
 
 
 
 

1953 births
Actresses from Chicago
American musical theatre actresses
American voice actresses
Living people
Loyola University Chicago alumni
Neverland Express members
People from Mokena, Illinois
Singers from Chicago
20th-century American actresses
20th-century American singers
21st-century American singers
20th-century American women singers
21st-century American women singers